John Bryce (1849 – 13 June 1878) was a New Zealand cricketer. He played in one first-class match for Wellington in 1876/77.

See also
 List of Wellington representative cricketers

References

External links
 

1849 births
1878 deaths
New Zealand cricketers
Wellington cricketers
Cricketers from Inverness
Scottish emigrants to New Zealand